Cazes or Cazès may refer to:

People
 Charles de Cazes (1808–1867), notary and politician in Canada East
 Clive Cazes (1929–1989), Gibraltarian actor
 Daniel Cazés (1939–2012), Mexican anthropologist 
 David Cazès (1851–1913), Moroccan Jewish educator and writer
 Jean-Louis Cazes (b. 1951), French footballer
 Jean-Michel Cazes (b. 1935), French winemaker and insurance executive
 Mario Cazes (1890–1972), French composer, conductor and violinist
 Pierre-Jacques Cazes (1676–1754), French historical painter
 Romain Cazes (1810–1881), French historical painter

Places
 Cazes-Mondenard, a commune in France
 Pueblo Cazes, a village and municipality in Argentina

See also
 Caze (disambiguation)